Danao-Danao Island (variously Danao Danao island, Danao Island, Dunad Island, Dunao Island or Dunao Islet) is a small, low-lying island in northeastern Iloilo, Philippines. It is part of the municipality of Concepcion.

Location and geography 

Part of the Concepcion Islands, it is separated from nearby Bulubadiangan Island by a small reef.

Natural disasters

Typhoon Haiyan 

In 2013, Typhoon Haiyan (locally known as Yolanda) Passed over Danao-Danao, damaging boats and homes. Rather than evacuate, some villagers stayed behind during the storm, in order to protect their boats. Four men went missing as a result.

See also 

 List of islands in the Philippines

References

External links
 Dunao Island at OpenStreetMap

Islands of Iloilo